Tainan is a railway station in Tainan, Taiwan served by Taiwan High Speed Rail, and is connected to  station for TRA services. Tainan HSR station is about 17 km away from Tainan railway station.

Overview
Tainan station was designed by Fei & Cheng Associates and constructed primarily by Shimizu Corporation. The station is an elevated structure with two side platforms.

The roof of the station building and the platform are horizontally connected, and an oval-shaped skylight is installed in the center of the station hall.

History
 2006-11-03: Opened for service.
 2007-01-05: The segment from Banqiao to  opened for service. Trains begin stopping at Tainan Station.

Platform layout

Station layout

Shuttle Bus
The station has a Bus stop located nearby Exit 2.
Bus Route
【H31】 HSR Tainan Station ─ Tainan City Hall
【H62】 HSR Tainan Station ─ Chimei Medical Center
【G16】 HSR Tainan Station ─ Guanmiao Junior High School ─ Guanmiao Bus Station ─ Sinhun Bus Station
【R3】 Guanmiao Bus Station ─ HSR Tainan Station ─ Tainan Airport ─TRA Tainan Station ─ Tainan Bus Station
【R14】 Chang Jung Christian University ─ HSR Tainan Station ─ Downtown Gueiren ─ Guanmiao Bus Station

HSR services
HSR services (1)2xx, (1)3xx, 583, 598, (1)6xx, and (8)8xx call at this station.

Around the station
 Provincial Highway No. 86
 Mitsui Outlet Park Tainan
 National Cheng Kung University Aviation Space and Technology Research Center
 National Yang Ming Chiao Tung University, Tainan campus
 Chang Jung Christian University
 Shalun Smart Green Energy Science City
Taiwan Tainan Detention Center

Image gallery

See also
 Taiwan High Speed Rail
 Tainan

Sources
 Dynamic Bus Information System of Tainan
 The routes of THSR shuttle bus (Chinese)

References

Railway stations served by Taiwan High Speed Rail
Railway stations in Tainan
Railway stations opened in 2006
Shimizu Corporation